George Adams the younger (1750–1795) was an English scientist, optician and scientific writer. He was mathematical instrument maker to King George III of Great Britain, succeeding his father George Adams in the post. He also made globes.

Around 1770, Adams invented the lucernal microscope, a type of projection microscope where the image is projected on a screen by a large oil lamp, as to make it easier to draw or trace the image.

In politics Adams was a Tory, and as such was received with favour at court by George III. He died 14 August 1795, at Southampton, and was succeeded in his business and in the post of mathematical instrument maker to the king by his brother, Dudley Adams.

Works

Adams wrote elementary scientific works, and on the use of mathematical instruments. He often combined religious with a scientific content, against, according to the Gentleman's Magazine, the "growing errors of materialism, infidelity, and anarchy". He started writing at a young age, and developed a love for it. His main interests iwere science and mathematics. His works were:

 An Essay on Electricity, to which is added an Essay on Magnetism (1784). 
 
 
 An Essay on Vision, briefly explaining the fabric of the eye (1789).
 
 A Short Dissertation on the Barometer (1790). 
 Geometrical and Graphical Essays, containing a description of the mathematical instruments used in geometry, civil and military surveying, levelling and perspective (1790). 
 Lectures on Natural and Experimental Philosophy, in five volumes (1794).

For some of Adams's books, plates were published separately, and most of them had more than one edition.

Gallery

References

External links
 BEIC digital library: George Adams Jr., Astronomical and geographical essays, London, printed for the author by R. Hindmarsh, printer to His Royal Highness the prince of Wales, no. 32, Clerkenwell-Close; and sold by the author, n. 60, Fleet-street, 1790.

Attribution

1750 births
1795 deaths
British scientific instrument makers
English science writers
British opticians